Odda Fotball Klubb is a Norwegian association football club from the town of Odda in Odda municipality in Hordaland county.

It was founded on 1 December 1992 as a merger between Odda IL and Fonna. Its first sponsor was Norzink.

The men's football team currently plays in the Sixth Division, the seventh tier of Norwegian football league system. Its most famous former player is Håkon Opdal.

References

External links
 Official site 

Football clubs in Norway
Sport in Hordaland
Odda
Association football clubs established in 1992
1992 establishments in Norway